The Frimla is a sleeveless cropped waistcoat that originated in Algeria during the 19th century, it is a variation of the Algerian Ghlila.

The Frimla is said to have clearly developed in Algeria before French presence. Descending below the bust it features gold threads and large passementerie buttons.

See also
• Karakou 
• Ghlila

References

Algerian clothing